Poozhithode is a village located at the easternmost end of Calicut, Kerala, India. It is a hill country and is about 65 km from Calicut located in Chakittapara panchayath. Poozhithode has on its one side Kadunthara puzha and on the other side Wyanad forest.

Peruvannamoozhi Project
Peruvannamoozhi irrigation project is about 9 km from Poozhithode. K.V.K. Peruvannamoozhi and Indian Institute Of Spices Research is also located at Peruvannamoozhi. The proposed Wyanad road from Poozhithode to Padinjarathara starts from Poozhithode. At present a mini hydroelectric project has come up at Ekkal at Poozhithode. The adjoining villages are Chempanoda and Passukadavu. The nearest town is Kuttiady which is about 17 km. Perambra is another big town located 25 km from Poozhithode. The nearest police station and forest range offices are at Peruvannamoozhi. Pottiyapara is the highest location at Poozhithode.

Geography
Poozhithode seems to come under an area rich in minerals. The pattern of natural events like lightning etc. seem to point out to the presence of some minerals. The study of mining and geology indicates some iron ore in the area.

The proposed Poozhithode- Padinjarethra (SH 54) passes through Poozhithode. It has been found to be the most suitable alternative paths to Wyanad. The work of the wayanad road has been in some uncertainty for the past few years. St. Mary's church is the Catholic Church located at Poozhithode. Poozhithode angady is divided into two known as thazhathey angadi and mukalilthe angadi. The people mainly are Catholics, Hindu's and a few Muslims. The people live in harmony. Union Bank Of India has a branch at Poozhithode. There is UP school at Poozhithode. Pin code of Poozhithode is 673 528.

Transportation
Poozhithode village connects to other parts of India through Vatakara town on the west and Kuttiady town on the east. National highway No.66 passes through Vatakara and the northern stretch connects to Mangalore, Goa and Mumbai. The southern stretch connects to Cochin and Trivandrum. The eastern National Highway No.54 going through Kuttiady connects to Mananthavady, Mysore and Bangalore. The nearest airports are at Kannur and Kozhikode. The nearest railway station is at Vatakara.

References

External links 

 Peruvannamuzhi
 dept.

Kuttiady area